Oryctocephalidae is an extinct family of trilobite in the order Corynexochida. There are more than 20 genera and 60 described species in Oryctocephalidae.

Genera
These 27 genera belong to the family Oryctocephalidae:

 Oryctometopus Tomashpol'skaya, 1964
 † Arthricocephalus Bergeron, 1899
 † Changaspis Lee, 1963
 † Cheiruroides Kobayashi, 1935
 † Curvoryctocephalus Zhao & Yuan, 2001
 † Duyunaspis Chien & Lin, 1978
 † Feilongshania Qian & Lin, 1980
 † Goldfieldia Palmer, 1964
 † Hunanocephalus Lee, 1963
 † Kunshanaspis Zhang & Zhou, 1985
 † Metabalangia Qian & Yuan, 1980
 † Metarthricocephalus Zhao & Yuan, 2001
 † Microryctocara Sundberg & McCollum, 1997
 † Oryctocara Walcott, 1908
 † Oryctocephalina Tomashpolskaya, 1961
 † Oryctocephalites Resser, 1939
 † Oryctocephaloides Yuan, 1980
 † Oryctocephalops Lermontova, 1940
 † Oryctocephalus Walcott, 1886
 † Ovatoryctocara Chernysheva, 1962
 † Paleooryctocephalus Repina, 1964
 † Parachangaspis Liu, 1982
 † Protoryctocephalus Chow, 1974
 † Sandoveria Shergold, 1969
 † Shabaella Qian & Sun, 1977
 † Shergoldiella Geyer, 2006
 † Tonkinella Mansuy, 1922

References

 
Articles created by Qbugbot
Trilobite families